Two in a Taxi is a 1941 American film directed by Robert Florey.  Writer Marvin Wald was inspired by seeing a production of Clifford Odets' Waiting for Lefty to write this drama of cab drivers and their economic struggles.

Cast
 Anita Louise as Bonnie
 Russell Hayden as Jimmy Owens
 Noah Beery Jr. as Sandy Connors
 Dick Purcell as Bill Gratton
 Chick Chandler as Sid
 Fay Helm as Ethel
 Frank Yaconelli as Tony Vitale
 George Cleveland as Gas Station Proprietor
 Ben Taggart as Sweeny
 Paul Porcasi as Herman
 Henry Brandon as the professor
 John Harmon as Benny
 James Seay as Cristy Reardon

References

External links
 

1941 films
Columbia Pictures films
Films directed by Robert Florey
1941 crime drama films
American crime drama films
American black-and-white films
1940s American films
1940s English-language films